FILMguerrero is an independent record label based in Portland, Oregon. It was founded in 1998 by John Askew as a way to release Ames, the debut album by Askew's band  Tracker.

Roster
 Gabriel "Naim" Amor
 Buellton
 Graves
 Holy Sons
 Lackthereof
 Manta Ray
 Menomena
 Mount Analog
 Norfolk & Western
 Adam Selzer
 Tracker
 Transmissionary Six
 Laura Veirs
 Wasted Tape

See also
 List of companies based in Oregon
 List of record labels

External links
Official site

Record labels established in 1998
Rock record labels
Indie pop record labels
American independent record labels
Oregon record labels
Companies based in Portland, Oregon
Privately held companies based in Oregon
1998 establishments in Oregon